Alamin Mohammed Seid (born 1946–1947 –died 15 November 2021) was an Eritrean politician.

He was born in Massawa, Eritrea.

Alamin was involved in the Eritrean War of Independence since 1964 when he joined the Eritrean Liberation Front. He later joined what would become the Eritrean People's Liberation Front (EPLF) in 1970. During the War of Independence he was the head of the EPLF's foreign relations department.

Alamin also served briefly as the Minister of Information and Culture. He and Isaias Afewerki were the only two members of the EPLF Executive Committee to be part of the People's Front for Democracy and Justice's Executive Council at the Third Congress. At this Congress he was elected to the Secretary position, where he served.

References

External links
 Picture

1940s births
2021 deaths
People from Northern Red Sea Region
Eritrean Muslims
People's Front for Democracy and Justice politicians
Government ministers of Eritrea